The Central Arkansas Library System (CALS) Encyclopedia of Arkansas is a web-based encyclopedia of the U.S. state of Arkansas, described by the National Endowment for the Humanities (NEH) as "a free, authoritative source of information about the history, politics, geography, and culture of the state of Arkansas."

The encyclopedia is a project of the Butler Center for Arkansas Studies at the Little Rock-based CALS.  CALS has pledged to keep the encyclopedia in operation in perpetuity.

The project was officially launched in 2006 with 700 entries and 900 multimedia items. The website was redesigned in 2019 to add functions and support for mobile devices. The project has a staff of five; articles are written by volunteer contributors who receive a payment of 5 cents per word. Tom W. Dillard was the Founding Editor;  the editor is Guy Lancaster, who was one of the first interns. The project is financially supported by the NEH; the Department of Arkansas Heritage, Arkansas General Assembly, and Arkansas Humanities Council; and by various foundations, principally the Winthrop Rockefeller Foundation.

The most-visited page on Encyclopedia of Arkansas is that of the Little Rock Nine.  Other entries range from slime mold to various Civil War battles and skirmishes in Arkansas to cheese dip.

See also 
 List of online encyclopedias

Notes

External links 

 
 Encyclopedia of Arkansas Minute from KUAR

21st-century encyclopedias
2006 non-fiction books
2006 establishments in Arkansas
Arkansas
Arkansas culture
Arkansas
History of Arkansas
Publications established in 2006